Lütfü Aksoy (17 July 1911 - 5 September 1998) was a Turkish footballer. He competed in the men's tournament at the 1936 Summer Olympics.

References

External links
 

1911 births
Year of death missing
Turkish footballers
Turkey international footballers
Olympic footballers of Turkey
Footballers at the 1936 Summer Olympics
Place of birth missing
Association football defenders
Karşıyaka S.K. footballers
Galatasaray S.K. footballers